Music for Two in Love is a Patti Page LP album, issued by Mercury Records as catalog number MG-20099. Musical accompaniment was by Jack Rael's Orchestra.

Track list

References

1956 albums
Patti Page albums
Mercury Records albums